Myozenin-1 is a protein that in humans is encoded by the MYOZ1 gene.

Interactions
MYOZ1 has been shown to interact with Telethonin, FLNC and Actinin, alpha 2.

References

Further reading